Little Red Riding Hood is a 1953 West German family film directed by Fritz Genschow and starring Daniela Maris, Werner Stock and Rita-Maria Nowottnick. It is based on the fairy tale Little Red Riding Hood.

It should not be confused with another German adaptation Little Red Riding Hood directed by Walter Janssen, which was released the following year.

Cast
 Daniela Maris as Heidi
 Werner Stock as Kesselflicker
 Rita-Maria Nowottnick as Elfe
 Else Ehser as Großmutter
 Renée Stobrawa as Mutter
 Fritz Genschow as Jäger
 Theodor Vogeler
 Max Grothusen
 Rüdiger Lichti
 Erika Petrick

References

Bibliography 
 Jill Nelmes & Jule Selbo. Women Screenwriters: An International Guide. Palgrave Macmillan, 2015.

External links 
 

1953 films
1950s fantasy films
German fantasy films
West German films
1950s German-language films
Films directed by Fritz Genschow
Films based on Little Red Riding Hood
German children's films
1950s German films